The 1988 FA Charity Shield was the 66th Charity Shield, a football match contested by the winners of the previous season's Football League and FA Cup competitions. The match was played on 20 August 1988 between 1987–88 Football League champions Liverpool and 1987–88 FA Cup winners Wimbledon.

The fixture was a rematch of previous season's FA Cup Final, and Liverpool gained some small revenge for that defeat with a 2–1 win, with both of their goals coming from John Aldridge – the player whose penalty in the FA Cup Final, three months earlier had been saved.  However, the man who had saved his penalty – Wimbledon's goalkeeper Dave Beasant – had gone, transferred to Newcastle United in the close season, and his place for this game was taken by Simon Tracey.

Wimbledon had taken the lead in the 17th minute with a John Fashanu header from a Dennis Wise cross from the right. Liverpool equalized with John Aldridge scoring after 23 minutes. Wimbledon goalkeeper Simon Tracey had come out of the penalty box to clear the ball, but the ball was quickly passed to Aldridge from John Barnes who rolled the ball into the empty net from the edge of the penalty area. Liverpool took the lead after 69 minutes with Aldridge again scoring after a cross from John Barnes. Barnes had made a long run down the left and crossed to Aldridge who controlled the ball with his left leg before volleying with his right to the net.

Match details

References

External links
Match report at LFCHistory.net

1988
Charity Shield 1988
Charity Shield 1988
Comm
Charity Shield
August 1988 sports events in the United Kingdom